The Djibouti Cup is the premier professional football tournament in Djibouti.

Winners
1988: AS Port                                               0-0 ACPM [aet, 4-3 pen]
1989: AS Port                                               4–2  Chemin de Fer Djibouto-Ethiopien
1990: AS Port 
1991: AS Aéroport                                           2-1 AS Port
1992: AS Compagnie Djibouti-Ethiopie (Djib.)                4–3 AS Etablissements Merill 
1993: Force Nationale de Sécurité (Djibouti)                bt  ONED
1994: FC Balbala                                            0-0 AS Ali Sabieh [aet, 5–4 on pen]
1995: FC Balbala
1996: FC Balbala
1997: Force Nationale de Police
1998: Force Nationale de Police
1999: FC Balbala
2000: AS Port 
2001: Chemin de Fer Djibouto-Ethiopien
2002: Jeunesse Espoir                                       bt  Chemin de Fer Djibouto-Ethiopien
2003: AS Borreh                                                 1-1 AS Ali Sabieh [aet, 5-4 pen]
2004: Chemin de Fer Djibouto-Ethiopien                          6-2 AS Borreh
2005: Poste de Djibouti                                         2-0 AS Port
2006: AS Ali Sabieh          3-0 Gendarmerie Nationale FC
2007: FC Société Immobilière de Djibouti                        1-1 AS CDE-Colas [aet, 4-3 pen]
2008: AS CDE-Colas	                                       1-1 Guelleh Batal [aet, 4-3 pen]
2009: Guelleh Batal                   0-0 AS Ali Sabieh [13-12 pen]
2010: AS Port                                               3-2 Guelleh Batal
2011: AS Port                                               2-0 ASAS/Djibouti Télécom
2012: Guelleh Batal                   2-1 ASAS/Djibouti Télécom
2013: AS Port                                               1-1 ASAS/Djibouti Télécom [aet, 4-3 pen]
2014: AS Tadjourah                                          1-1 Guelleh Batal [aet, Tadjourah on pen]
2015: Guelleh Batal                   2-0 AS Port
2016: ASAS/Djibouti Télécom  1-1 FC Dikhil [aet, 4-3 pen]
2017: Gendarmerie Nationale FC                              0-0 Guelleh Batal [aet, 7-6 pen]
2018: ASAS/Djibouti Télécom  1-0 Bahache/Université de Djibouti
2019: AS Arta/Solar7                              0-0 Gendarmerie Nationale FC [aet, 3-0 pen]
2020: AS Arta/Solar7                              1-0 ASAS/Djibouti Télécom
2021: AS Arta/Solar7                              0-0 FC Dikhil [aet, 4-3 pen]
2022: AS Arta/Solar7                              3-1 ASAS/Djibouti Télécom

See also
Djibouti Premier League
Djibouti Super Cup

References

Djibouti Cup Winners, RSSSF.com

Football competitions in Djibouti
National association football cups